James Oscar McKinsey (June 4, 1889 – November 30, 1937) was an American accountant, management consultant, professor of accounting at the University of Chicago, and founder of McKinsey & Company.

Biography

Youth, education and early career 
McKinsey was born in 1889 in Gamma, Missouri, son of James Madison McKinsey and Mary Elizabeth (Logan) McKinsey. After attending regular public school, McKinsey initially received training as a teacher at the Warrensburg Teachers College, now University of Central Missouri, where in 1912 he obtained his Bachelor of Pedagogy. 

McKinsey continued to study law at the University of Arkansas, where he obtained his law degree one year later, in 1913. In 1914 he studied bookkeeping at the St. Louis University, and started his working career by teaching bookkeeping at St. Louis University.  

Next McKinsey entered the University of Chicago, where in 1917 he obtained his BPhil degree. After serving in the U.S. Army in World War I, he returned to the University of Chicago. There in 1919 he obtained his MA in commerce and passed the Certified Public Accountant (CPA) examination, to act as certified public accountant in the State of Illinois.

Further career 
In 1917 McKinsey had joined the accounting faculty of the University of Chicago, and would continue to lecture there on and off until 1935. In 1926 he was promoted to full professor. In the college year 1920-21 he had lectured accounting at Columbia University, and in 1921 had joined a private accounting practice. In 1922 he published his first major work, entitled Budgetary Control. 

In 1926 McKinsey founded his own consultancy firm, McKinsey & Company, in Chicago, where he served as senior partner until 1935. In 1935 he accepted the appointment as chairman of the board at Marshall Field & Company, a department store in Chicago, and made Andrew Thomas Kearney managing partner of the Chicago office. In 1936 he was also elected chairman of the American Management Association.  

Flesher & Flesher explained that McKinsey "soon turned Marshall Field's red ink into profit, but he may have done so at the cost of his health. He died of pneumonia on November 30, 1937."

Selected publications 
 Hodge, Albert Claire & James Oscar McKinsey, Principles of accounting, Chicago, Univ. of Chicago Press, 1920.
 McKinsey, J.O. Bookkeeping and Accounting, Volume 1. Cincinnati: South-Western, 1920. 
 McKinsey, J.O. Bookkeeping and Accounting, Volume 2. Cincinnati: South-Western, 1920. 
 McKinsey, James O. Budgetary control. New York: The Ronald Press, 1922.
 McKinsey, James Oscar. Managerial Accounting. Vol. 1. University of Chicago Press, 1924.
 McKinsey, James O. Business Administration. South-Western Publishing Co, Cincinnati, Ohio 1924.

References

1889 births
1937 deaths
Deaths from pneumonia in Illinois
American accountants
American consultants
American people of Scottish descent
University of Central Missouri alumni
University of Arkansas alumni
Saint Louis University alumni
Saint Louis University faculty
University of Chicago faculty
Columbia University faculty
People from Montgomery County, Missouri
McKinsey & Company people